Eas a' Chual Aluinn in the parish of Assynt, Sutherland, Highland, Scotland, is the tallest waterfall in the United Kingdom with a sheer drop of . When in full flow it is over three times taller than Niagara Falls.

In good weather, a boat-trip runs from the slipway by the Kylesku Hotel to Loch Beag, from where the waterfall is visible.

References

External links 

  A panorama view of Eas a' Chual Aluinn

Waterfalls of Highland (council area)
Landforms of Sutherland